FC Tatran Prešov is a Slovak football club based in the city of Prešov. Tatran Prešov is the oldest football club in Slovakia, founded on 25 May 1898. The club currently participates in the 2.liga. The "Green and Whites" played 32 seasons in the Czechoslovak top division. Tatran became the dark horse of the Czechoslovak league in the 1960s and 1970s, but never won a title. The greatest league success was the second place in the 1965 and 1973 seasons. The club also came close in the Czechoslovak Cup, losing twice in 1966 and 1992 finals.

History overview

Early history

The first official football match on the territory of present-day Slovakia took place on 25 May 1898 in Eperjes, today's Prešov, that time in Hungary, between two Budapest-based teams, Óbudai TE and Budapesti TC on the initiation of František Pethe, a gymnastic teacher in the local grammar school. On the same day the Eperjesi Torna és Vívó Egyesület (Eperjesi TVE, lit. Gymnastic and Fencing Association of Eperjes) was founded, which is regarded as the first football club of Slovakia.

Eperjesi TVE initially competed in the Hungarian league system, achieving its best result in the 1907–08 season, when it won the Northern District Championship.

In 1920 Prešov became part of the newly founded Czechoslovakia, subsequently the club competed in the Czechoslovak leagues.

Prešov finished in second place in the Czechoslovak First League in 1965 and 1973, finishing the season just one point behind champions Spartak Trnava in the 1972–73 season. In the national cup the team also had success, reaching the final of the Czechoslovak Cup in 1966, where they lost to Dukla Prague and in 1992 where Sparta Prague were victorious.

The greatest legend of Tatran's Prešov history is Ladislav Pavlovič. From 1948 until 1966, he netted for Tatran Prešov 150 goals in 309 matches. He also represented Czechoslovakia national football team, where he played 14 matches and scored two goals. In 2013, he was stated to Prešov's Hall of Fame.

Previous names
 Eperjesi Torna és Vívó Egyesület (Hungarian version), ETVE Prešov (1898)
 TVE Prešov (1920)
 Slávia Prešov (1931)
 PTS Prešov (1945)
 DSO Slavia Prešov a DSO Snaha Prešov (split from PTS Prešov) (1947)
 Sparta Dukla Prešov (1948)
 Dukla Prešov (1950)
 Dukla ČSSZ Prešov (1951)
 ČSSZ Prešov (1952)
 DSO Tatran Prešov (1953)
 TJ Tatran Prešov (1960)
 Tatran Agro Prešov (1989)
 FC Tatran Prešov (1991)
 FC Tatran Bukóza Prešov (1996)
 FC Tatran Prešov (1998)
 1.FC Tatran Prešov (2005)
 FC Tatran Prešov (2022)

Honours

Domestic
 Czechoslovakia
 Czechoslovak First League (1925–93)
  Runners-up (2): 1964–65, 1972–73
 Czechoslovak Cup (1960–93)
  Runners-up (2): 1965–66, 1991–92
 1.SNL (1st Slovak National football league) (1969–1993)
  Winners (2): 1979–80, 1989–90

 Slovakia
 Slovenský Pohár (Slovak Cup) (1961–)
  Winners (1): 1992
  Runners-up (4): 1973, 1985, 1994, 1997
 2. liga (Slovak second division)
  Winners (2): 2007-08, 2015-16
  Third (2): 2003-04, 2014-15
 3. liga východ (Slovak third division east) 
  Winners (2): 2019-20, 2021-22
  Third (1): 2020-21

Czechoslovak and Slovak Top Goalscorer
The Czechoslovak League top scorer from 1944 to 1945 until 1992–93. Since the 1993–94 Slovak League Top scorer.

1Shared award

European
 Mitropa Cup
   Winners (1): 1981
 InterCup
   Winners (1): 1978

Results

League and Cup history
Slovak League only (1993–present)

{|class="wikitable"
|-bgcolor="#efefef"
! style="color:white; background:#06641D;"| Season
! style="color:white; background:#06641D;"|    Division (Name)
! style="color:white; background:#06641D;"| Pos./Teams
! style="color:white; background:#06641D;"| Pl.
! style="color:white; background:#06641D;"| W
! style="color:white; background:#06641D;"| D
! style="color:white; background:#06641D;"| L
! style="color:white; background:#06641D;"| GS
! style="color:white; background:#06641D;"| GA
! style="color:white; background:#06641D;"| P
! style="color:white; background:#06641D;"|Domestic Cup
! style="color:white; background:#06641D;" colspan=2|Europe
! style="color:white; background:#06641D;"|Top Scorer (Goals)
|-
|align=center|1993–94
|align=center|1st (Mars Superliga)
|align=center|4/(12)
|align=center|32
|align=center|10
|align=center|14
|align=center|8
|align=center|47
|align=center|43
|align=center|34
|align=center bgcolor=silver|Runner-up
|align=center|
|align=center|
|align=center|
|-
|align=center|1994–95
|align=center|1st (Mars Superliga)
|align=center|9/(12)
|align=center|32
|align=center|9
|align=center|10
|align=center|13
|align=center|42
|align=center|49
|align=center|37
|align=center|1/2 finals
|align=center|UC
|align=center|2R ( Real Zaragoza)
|align=center|
|-
|-
|align=center|1995–96
|align=center|1st (Mars Superliga)
|align=center|5/(12)
|align=center|32
|align=center|12
|align=center|7
|align=center|13
|align=center|34
|align=center|36
|align=center|43
|align=center|1/32 finals
|align=center|
|align=center|
|align=center|
|-
|align=center|1996–97
|align=center|1st (Mars Superliga)
|align=center|6/(16)
|align=center|30
|align=center|12
|align=center|7
|align=center|11
|align=center|37
|align=center|38
|align=center|43
|align=center bgcolor=silver|Runner-up
|align=center|
|align=center|
|align=center|
|-
|align=center|1997–98
|align=center|1st (Mars Superliga)
|align=center|10/(16)
|align=center|30
|align=center|9
|align=center|9
|align=center|12
|align=center|29
|align=center|39
|align=center|36
|align=center|1/4 finals
|align=center|
|align=center|
|align=center|  Milan Jambor (5)
|-
|align=center|1998–99
|align=center|1st (Mars Superliga)
|align=center|8/(16)
|align=center|30
|align=center|11
|align=center|10
|align=center|9
|align=center|38
|align=center|35
|align=center|43
|align=center|1/16 finals
|align=center|
|align=center|
|align=center|  Vladimír Kožuch (7)   Anton Šoltis (7)
|-
|align=center|1999–00
|align=center|1st (Mars Superliga)
|align=center|6/(16)
|align=center|30
|align=center|14
|align=center|5
|align=center|11
|align=center|38
|align=center|42
|align=center|47
|align=center|1/16 finals
|align=center|
|align=center|
|align=center|  Vladimír Kožuch (8)
|-
|align=center|2000–01
|align=center|1st (Mars Superliga)
|align=center|7/(10)
|align=center|36
|align=center|10
|align=center|10
|align=center|16
|align=center|44
|align=center|54
|align=center|40
|align=center|1/32 finals
|align=center|
|align=center|
|align=center|  Marek Petruš (7)   Július Lelkeš (7)
|-
|align=center|2001–02
|align=center|1st (Mars Superliga)
|align=center bgcolor=red|10/(10)
|align=center|36
|align=center|8
|align=center|7
|align=center|21
|align=center|35
|align=center|66
|align=center|40
|align=center|1/16 finals
|align=center|
|align=center|
|align=center|  Ján Šlahor (7)
|-
|align=center|2002–03
|align=center|2nd (1. liga)
|align=center|9/(16)
|align=center|30
|align=center|11
|align=center|6
|align=center|13
|align=center|40
|align=center|37
|align=center|39
|align=center|1/4 finals
|align=center|
|align=center|
|align=center| Lukáš Hricov (7)
|-
|align=center|2003–04
|align=center|2nd (1. liga)
|align=center bgcolor=tan|3/(16)
|align=center|30
|align=center|15
|align=center|7
|align=center|8
|align=center|54
|align=center|35
|align=center|52
|align=center|1/8 finals
|align=center|
|align=center|
|align=center| Martin Jakubko (13)
|-
|align=center|2004–05
|align=center|2nd (1. liga)
|align=center|5/(16)
|align=center|30
|align=center|12
|align=center|8
|align=center|10
|align=center|38
|align=center|33
|align=center|44
|align=center|1/32 finals
|align=center|
|align=center|
|align=center|  Ľubomír Pagor (7)
|-
|align=center|2005–06
|align=center|2nd (1. liga)
|align=center|5/(16)
|align=center|30
|align=center|15
|align=center|7
|align=center|8
|align=center|37
|align=center|22
|align=center|52
|align=center|1/32 finals
|align=center|
|align=center|
|align=center|  Peter Iskra (6)
|-
|align=center|2006–07
|align=center|2nd (1. liga)
|align=center|5/(12)
|align=center|36
|align=center|16
|align=center|14
|align=center|6
|align=center|55
|align=center|25
|align=center|62
|align=center|1/8 finals
|align=center|
|align=center|
|align=center|  Tomáš Kaplan (8)
|-
|align=center|2007–08
|align=center|2nd (1. liga)
|align=center bgcolor=green|1/(12)
|align=center|33
|align=center|23
|align=center|8
|align=center|2
|align=center|64
|align=center|14
|align=center|77
|align=center|1/4 finals
|align=center|
|align=center|
|align=center|  Ľuboš Belejík (7)
|-
|align=center|2008–09
|align=center|1st (Corgoň Liga)
|align=center|7/(12)
|align=center|33
|align=center|10
|align=center|11
|align=center|12
|align=center|40
|align=center|50
|align=center|41
|align=center|1/16 finals
|align=center|
|align=center|
|align=center|  Peter Katona (7)
|-
|align=center|2009–10
|align=center|1st (Corgoň Liga)
|align=center|8/(12)
|align=center|33
|align=center|11
|align=center|5
|align=center|17
|align=center|32
|align=center|38
|align=center|38
|align=center|1/8 finals
|align=center|
|align=center|
|align=center|  Peter Katona (5)
|-
|align=center|2010–11
|align=center|1st (Corgoň Liga)
|align=center|11/(12)
|align=center|33
|align=center|9
|align=center|6
|align=center|18
|align=center|30
|align=center|49
|align=center|33
|align=center|1/16 finals
|align=center|
|align=center|
|align=center|  Jhonatan (5)
|-
|align=center|2011–12
|align=center|1st (Corgoň Liga)
|align=center|10/(12)
|align=center|33
|align=center|7
|align=center|12
|align=center|14
|align=center|23
|align=center|35
|align=center|33
|align=center|1/4 finals
|align=center|
|align=center|
|align=center|  Peter Katona (5)
|-
|align=center|2012–13
|align=center|1st (Corgoň Liga)
|align=center bgcolor=red|12/(12)
|align=center|33
|align=center|8
|align=center|9
|align=center|16
|align=center|21
|align=center|41
|align=center|33
|align=center|1/16 finals
|align=center|
|align=center|
|align=center|  Andriy Shevchuk (3)   Matúš Marcin (3)
|-
|align=center|2013–14
|align=center|2nd (DOXXbet Liga)
|align=center|4/(12)
|align=center|33
|align=center|18
|align=center|6
|align=center|9
|align=center|56
|align=center|28
|align=center|60
|align=center|1/4 finals
|align=center|
|align=center|
|align=center|  Dávid Leško (11)
|-
|align=center|2014–15
|align=center|2nd (DOXXbet Liga)
|align=center bgcolor=tan|3/(24)
|align=center|22
|align=center|10
|align=center|6
|align=center|6
|align=center|32
|align=center|24
|align=center|36
|align=center|1/32 finals
|align=center|
|align=center|
|align=center|  Pavol Šafranko (11)
|-
|align=center|2015–16
|align=center|2nd (DOXXbet Liga)
|align=center bgcolor=green|1/(24)
|align=center|30
|align=center|16
|align=center|10
|align=center|4
|align=center|61
|align=center|26
|align=center|58
|align=center|1/16 finals
|align=center|
|align=center|
|align=center|  Dávid Leško (16)
|-
|align=center|2016–17
|align=center|1st (Fortuna Liga)
|align=center|11/(12)
|align=center|30
|align=center|3
|align=center|10
|align=center|17
|align=center|17
|align=center|63
|align=center|19
|align=center|1/8 finals
|align=center| 
|align=center|
|align=center|  Musefiu Ashiru (5)
|-
|align=center|2017–18
|align=center|1st (Fortuna Liga)
|align=center bgcolor=red|12/(12)
|align=center|31
|align=center|4
|align=center|11
|align=center|16
|align=center|20
|align=center|55
|align=center|23
|align=center |1/32 finals
|align=center| 
|align=center| 
|align=center|  Roland Černák (7)
|-
|align=center|2018–19
|align=center|2nd (II. liga)
|align=center bgcolor=red|15/(16)
|align=center|30
|align=center|7
|align=center|6
|align=center|17
|align=center|30
|align=center|41
|align=center|27
|align=center |1/32 finals
|align=center| 
|align=center| 
|align=center|  Lukáš Hricov (3)
|-
|align=center|2019–20
|align=center|3rd (III. liga)
|align=center|1/(16)
|align=center|17
|align=center|14
|align=center|1
|align=center|2
|align=center|52
|align=center|14
|align=center|43
|align=center |1/32 finals
|align=center| 
|align=center| 
|align=center|  Kristián Hirka (12)
|-
|align=center|2020–21
|align=center|3rd (III. liga)
|align=center|3/(16)
|align=center|15
|align=center|10
|align=center|1
|align=center|4
|align=center|40
|align=center|15
|align=center|31
|align=center |1/32 finals
|align=center| 
|align=center| 
|align=center|  Samuel Gladiš (7)
|-
|align=center|2021–22
|align=center|3rd (III. liga)
|align=center bgcolor=green|1/(16)
|align=center|30
|align=center|25
|align=center|2
|align=center|3
|align=center|103
|align=center|20
|align=center|77
|align=center |1/32 finals
|align=center| 
|align=center| 
|align=center|  Jozef Dolný (41)
|}

European competition history

Rivalries
Tatran's biggest rivals are VSS Košice, and the matches between the two teams are referred to as "Eastern Slovak derby". 
They also have rivalry with MFK Zemplín Michalovce and FC Spartak Trnava. 1. FC Tatran Prešov supporters maintain friendly relations with fans of the Polish side JKS Czarni 1910 Jasło.

Sponsorship

Club partners 
source
DÚHA
Ekofin

Current squad
Updated 27 February 2023.

For recent transfers, see List of Slovak football transfers winter 2022–23

Out on loan 2022–23

Reserve team
1. FC Tatran Prešov juniori was the reserve team of 1. FC Tatran Prešov. They mostly played in the Slovak 3. Liga (Eastern division).

Squad

Current technical staff
Updated 18 June 2022

Player records

Most goals

Players whose name is listed in bold are still active.

Notable players
Had international caps for their respective countries. Players whose name is listed in bold represented their countries while playing for Tatran.

For full list, see :Category:1. FC Tatran Prešov players

Notable fan
 Milan Timoš (1948–2012)

Notable managers

  František Pethe (1898–04)
  Iszer Károly (sept 1898)
  Bohumil Peťura (1940–41)
  Július Grobár (1941–42)
  Jozef Kuchár (1942–43)
  Július Grobár (1943)
  Vojtech Herdický (1943)
  Ferenc Szedlacsek (1950)
  Jozef Karel (1951–57)
  Jozef Steiner (1957–59)
  Gejza Šimanský (1959)
  Štefan Jačianský (1960–61)
  Jozef Kuchár (1961–62)
  Gejza Sabanoš (1962–64)
  Jozef Karel (1964–65)
  Jozef Steiner (1965–66)
  Jozef Karel (1966)
  Teodor Reimann (1967–68)
  Jozef Karel (1968–72)
  Milan Moravec (1972–74)
  Ladislav Pavlovič (1974)
  Jozef Tarcala (1975)
  Štefan Jačianský (1976–78)
  Belo Malaga (1978–79)
  Michal Baránek (1979)
  Štefan Hojsík (1979–81)
  Ján Zachar (1981–82)
  Valér Švec (1982–84)
  Jozef Jarabinský (1984–85)
  Justin Javorek (1985–86)
  Peter Majer (1986–87)
  Juraj Mihalčín (1987–88)
  Albert Rusnák (1988)
  Štefan Nadzam (1989–93)
  Igor Novák (1993–94)
  Belo Malaga (1994–95)
  Anton Jánoš (1995–97)
  Andrej Daňko (1997–98)
  Jozef Adamec (1998–99)
  Mikuláš Komanický (1999–01)
  Jindřich Dejmal (2001–02)
  Vladimír Gombár (2002)
  Ján Molka (2002)
  Vladimír Gombár (2002–04)
  Karol Kisel (2004)
  Mikuláš Komanický (2004–05)
  Štefan Horný (July 2005–Sept 05)
  Jaroslav Rybár (Sept 2005–06)
  Saulius Širmelis (Jan 2006–July 6)
  Ján Karaffa (July 2006)
  Jozef Daňko (Aug 2006)
  Peter Polák (Aug 2006–Feb 07)
  Roman Pivarník (Feb 2007–Aug 10)
  Ladislav Pecko (Sept 2010–June 11)
  Štefan Tarkovič (July 2011–Jan 12)
  Serhiy Kovalets (Jan 2012–June 12)
  Angel Chervenkov (July 2012–Nov 12)
  Ladislav Totkovič (Nov 2012–April 13)
  Jozef Bubenko (April 2013–May 13)
  Jozef Kostelník (June 2013-May 14)
  Stanislav Varga (July 2014-Oct 14, 2016)
  Ján Karaffa (carateker) (Oct 2016)
  Miroslav Jantek (Nov 2016-Sept 2017)
  Pavol Mlynár (Sept 2017-Oct 2017) (interim)
  Serhiy Kovalets (Oct 2017-Jan 2018)
  Anton Mišovec (Jan 2018-Apr 2019)
  Jaroslav Galko (April 2019-June 2019)
  Peter Petráš (July 2019-July 2021)
  Stanislav Šesták (July 2021-June 2022)
  Róbert Petruš (July 2021-June 2022)
  Marek Petruš (June 2022-)

References

External links 

Official website 

 
Presov, Tatran
Sport in Prešov
Association football clubs established in 1898
Presov, Tatran
1898 establishments in Austria-Hungary